Knorr–Bare Farm is a historic farm complex and national historic district located in Lower Heidelberg Township, Berks County, Pennsylvania.  It has 13 contributing buildings and 8 contributing structures.  They include a 2 1/2-story, four bay, brick farmhouse (1906); frame Pennsylvania bank barn (1896); and 1 1/2-story stone cabin (c. 1755).  The remaining buildings were mostly built between about 1896 and 1940, with two tenant houses dated to the late-18th century and mid-19th century.  Other buildings include a milk house, smoke house / bake house, privy, four wagon sheds, and a hay barn.  The contributing structures include a lime kiln, silo (c. 1940), and a variety of animal shelters.

It was listed on the National Register of Historic Places in 1992.

References

Farms on the National Register of Historic Places in Pennsylvania
Historic districts on the National Register of Historic Places in Pennsylvania
1755 establishments in the Thirteen Colonies
Houses in Berks County, Pennsylvania
National Register of Historic Places in Berks County, Pennsylvania
Lime kilns in the United States